Dexopollenia uniseta is a species of cluster fly in the family Polleniidae.

Distribution
Malaysia, China.

References

Polleniidae
Insects described in 1992
Diptera of Asia